Ace of the Saddle is a 1919 American silent Western film directed by John Ford and featuring Harry Carey. The film is considered to be lost.

Plot
As described in a film magazine, Cheyenne Harry Henderson (Carey) owns a cattle ranch on the border of two counties, with Yucca County controlled by outlaws and Pinkerton County law abiding. After the Yucca sheriff (Harris) refuses to help stop the cattle rustling, he goes to Pinkerton Sheriff Faulkner (Lee), who is unable to help him because he lives in Yucca County. Harry meets and becomes romantically involved with Sheriff Faulkner's daughter Madeline (Pearce), who is also loved by the Yucca sheriff. Because she hates guns, Harry gives up using them. While Yucca County may be lawless, no man may be shot unless he is armed, so the Yucca sheriff devises a scheme place an unloaded gun in Harry's hands and then have him killed. Harry sees through the ruse and uses the sheriff's gun to kill two men before they can shoot him. Harry then moves his house over the county border onto Pinkerton County, and with the aid of Sheriff Faulkner two rustlers are captured. Before the rustlers can be hanged, the Yucca sheriff frees them and also kidnaps Madeline. Harry then gets his guns and goes to rescue her.

Cast
 Harry Carey as Cheyenne Harry Henderson
 Joe Harris as Sheriff, Yucca County
 Duke R. Lee as Sheriff Faulkner, Pinkerton County
 Peggy Pearce as Madeline Faulkner 
 Jack Walters as Inky O'Day
 Vester Pegg as Gambler
 William Courtright as Storekeeper (as William Cartwright)
 Zoe Rae as Child

See also
 List of American films of 1919
 Harry Carey filmography
 List of lost films

References

External links

 
 Ace of the Saddle at SilentEra

1919 films
1919 Western (genre) films
1919 lost films
American black-and-white films
Films directed by John Ford
Lost Western (genre) films
Lost American films
Universal Pictures films
Silent American Western (genre) films
1910s American films
1910s English-language films